Alfredo Moser (Uberaba) is a Brazilian mechanic and inventor.

Biography
Born in Uberaba, Minas Gerais in Brazil. He married Carmelinda in 1978. He invented what is known as the Moser lamp.

Moser lamp
Moser invented a lamp in 2002, using a plastic bottle filled with water fitted through a roof, which works by refraction of sunlight. It produces similar brightness to a 40- to 60-watt incandescent bulb during the hours of daylight, and uses no electricity or power other than natural light. It is easily fitted through a simple roof.

It was created as a response to constant electrical power cuts in Brazil. It lights, at no cost, many homes in many countries, including Philippines, India, Bangladesh, Tanzania, Argentina and Fiji. The movement became known as the Liter of Light.

Moser says "It's a divine light. God gave the sun to everyone, and light is for everyone. Whoever wants it saves money. You can't get an electric shock from it, and it doesn't cost a penny."

References 

Living people
Brazilian inventors
People from Minas Gerais
Year of birth missing (living people)